Antonio Zappia (born 13 June 1952) is an Australian politician and former powerlifting champion. He has been an Australian Labor Party member for the House of Representatives seat of Makin in South Australia since the 2007 election.

Background
Zappia attended Pooraka Primary School and Enfield High School, then from 1969 he worked for ANZ Bank. From 1976 to 1980, Zappia was employed as a research officer to Senator Jim Cavanagh. Zappia was Mayor of the City of Salisbury from 1997 to 2007 and a Councillor from 1977.

Zappia has run three fitness centres. Zappia has also won ten National Championships in powerlifting.

Parliament
From Makin's creation ahead of the 1984 election, the seat was always marginal and held by the party of government, often typical of mortgage belt seats. However, Zappia defeated Liberal candidate Bob Day at the 2007 election with a 57.7 percent two-party vote from an 8.6-point two-party swing as Labor won government, the largest two-party vote and swing of any party in Makin's history at the time, and was also the first time a Makin candidate won a majority of the primary vote. At the 2010 election, Zappia technically made it a safe Labor seat with a 62.2 percent two-party vote, again becoming the largest of any party in Makin's history. Zappia held the seat at the 2013 election with a reduced 55.1 percent two-party vote even as Labor lost government, albeit still the largest two-party vote, aside from 2010 and 2007, of any party in Makin's history. No longer a bellwether for the first time, Zappia became the first opposition member in the seat's history.

Personal life
Zappia lives in Pooraka and is married to Vicki with three children.

References

External links
Parliamentary Profile: Australian Parliament website
Parliamentary Profile: Labor website

1952 births
Living people
Mayors of places in South Australia
Australian Labor Party members of the Parliament of Australia
Labor Right politicians
Members of the Australian House of Representatives
Members of the Australian House of Representatives for Makin
Italian emigrants to Australia
People who lost Italian citizenship
Naturalised citizens of Australia
Australian politicians of Italian descent
People from Adelaide
Australian powerlifters
Labor Left politicians
21st-century Australian politicians
South Australian local councillors